was an Imperial Japanese Navy Sentoku-type (or I-400-class) submarine commissioned in 1945 for service in World War II. She surrendered to the United States at the end of the war in 1945 and was scuttled in 1946. Until 1965, the Sentaku-type submarines were the largest submarines ever commissioned.

Characteristics 
The I-400-class submarines had four  diesel engines and carried enough fuel to circumnavigate the world one-and-a-half times. Until the commissioning of the United States Navy ballistic missile submarine  in 1965, the I-400-class were the largest submarines ever commissioned.

The cross-section of the pressure hull had a unique figure-of-eight shape which afforded the strength and stability to support the weight of a large aircraft hangar and three floatplanes, with the conning tower offset to port to allow room for them. While I-402 was under construction, however, her aircraft and aircraft facilities were deleted, and she instead was completed as a submarine tanker capable of transporting aviation gasoline from the Japanese-occupied Netherlands East Indies to Japan.

Like other I-400-class submarines, I-402 was armed with eight  torpedo tubes, all in the bow, with 20 Type 95 torpedoes, a Type 11  deck gun on the after deck of the hangar, three waterproofed Type 96 triple-mount antiaircraft guns mounted atop what would have been the hangar — one forward and two aft of the conning tower — and a single Type 96 25 mm antiaircraft gun mounted just aft of the bridge.

I-400-class submarines had a rather noisy special trim system that allowed them to loiter submerged and stationary while awaiting the return of their aircraft; demagnetization cables meant to protect against magnetic mines by nullifying the submarine′s magnetic field; an air search radar, two air/surface-search radar sets, and a radar warning receiver; and an anechoic coating intended to make detection of the submarine while submerged more difficult by absorbing or diffusing sonar pulses and dampening reverberations from the submarine's internal machinery.

Construction and commissioning

Ordered as Submarine No. 5233, I-402 was laid down on 20 October 1943 by the Sasebo Naval Arsenal at Sasebo, Japan. She was launched on 5 September 1944, and was completed and commissioned as a submarine tanker on 24 July 1945

Service history

World War II
She was in port at Kure, Japan, on 11 August 1945 when Iwo Jima-based United States Army Air Forces P-51D Mustang fighters raided the area after 10:40. She suffered several near misses from bombs, and bomb fragments punctured her main fuel tanks in two places. Two members of her crew were wounded.

Hostilities between Japan and the Allies ended on 15 August 1945 before I-402 could begin her first voyage to the Japanese-occupied Netherlands East Indies for aviation gasoline. She surrendered to the Allies at Kure in September 1945.

Post-war
Operated by an American crew, I-402 moved from Kure to Sasebo in October 1945. On 30 November 1945, the Japanese struck her from the Navy list.

Disposal
With postwar relations with the Soviet Union deteriorating rapidly and concerns growing in the United States that under postwar agreements the Soviets would demand access to captured Japanese submarines that would provide the Soviet Navy with valuable information about advanced Japanese submarine designs, the U.S. Navy issued orders on 26 March 1946 to sink all captured Japanese submarines. Accordingly, I-402 was among 24 Japanese submarines the U.S. Navy scuttled off the Goto Islands in Operation Road's End on 1 April 1946.

Later events
In 2015, the precise locations of the wrecks of the 24 Japanese submarines scuttled off the Goto Islands, including that of I-402, were confirmed.

References

Bibliography
 Sakaida, Henry and Gary Nila, Koji Takaki. I-400: Japan's Secret Aircraft-Carrying Strike Submarine. Hikoki Publications, 2006. 
 

I-400-class submarines
1944 ships
Ships built by Sasebo Naval Arsenal
World War II submarines of Japan
Maritime incidents in 1946
Scuttled vessels
Ships sunk as targets
Shipwrecks in the Pacific Ocean
Shipwrecks of Japan